Ava Cantrell  is an American actress and dancer, best known for her role as Penelope Pritchard in the Nickelodeon series The Haunted Hathaways.

Life and career

Ava Cantrell was born in San Diego, California, and began her acting career in 2008.  She has appeared in many TV commercials, music videos and short films. She gained notoriety as Penelope Pritchard on Nickelodeon series The Haunted Hathaways and won a Young Artist Award in 2014 for her recurring role. She plays the lead role of Brooklyn in the 2015 web-series Cam Girls the Series which has won numerous awards.

In 2015 she was cast as Teen Diana in Lights Out, produced by James Wan and directed by David F. Sandberg. Cantrell also starred in the 2016 film One Under the Sun alongside Pooja Batra and Gene Farber directed by Vincent Tran. She is involved in many charities.

Cantrell is also an award-winning dancer competing between 2007-2014 in the styles of Ballet, Tap, Contemporary, and musical theater.  She has a YouTube channel showcasing these performances.

Filmography

Film

Television

References

External links
 
 Ava Cantrell Interview MSN

Actresses from San Diego
American film actresses
American web series actresses
American television actresses
21st-century American actresses
Living people
Year of birth missing (living people)